Octotapnia exotica is a species of beetle in the family Cerambycidae. It was described by Galileo and Martins in 1992.

References

Oreodera
Beetles described in 1992